A. N. M. Hamidullah (1919-1994) was the first governor of Bangladesh Bank, the central bank of Bangladesh. He served during 1972–1974.

Hamidullah's wife was killed in 1971 in an attack by the Pakistani Army.
He is born in Gazaria, Munshiganj. In 1971, Hamidullah was the managing director of Eastern Banking Corporation. His entire family was killed by Pak Army when they were attempting to leave Dacca by country boat during no-curfew hours. Hamidullah, who was not with them, is reportedly in state of shock.

In 1965 he got the post of Managing Director of Eastern Banking Corporation. The Scheduled Commercial Bank he founded became successful in no time and managed to establish 62 branches all over Pakistan. He served the bank till December 1971.

Later, Uttara Bank was established by Eastern Bank Corporation and Muslim Commercial Bank in the post-independence era. Later, Uttara Bank was established by Eastern Bank Corporation and Muslim Commercial Bank in the post-independence era.

He was appointed as the first Governor of Bangladesh Bank in 1972 after the independence of the country. Played an important role in organizing a central bank of the newly independent country. During this time, he efficiently dealt with complex issues such as note printing, currency system and regulation of credit system. He remained in the post of Governor till March 1975.

He served as ambassador to Kenya and Zambia in Africa from 1978 to 1982.

Returning to the country in 1982, first United Commercial Bank, then The City Bank Limited in 1984 and Al Baraka Bank in 1989 decorated the post of Executive President and Managing Director and created a new level of momentum in these ruined banking streams. Industrial Development Bank, various commercial banks and Bangladesh Bank will be a golden chapter of his working life due to his skill and expertise.

He is a Fellow of the Washington-based International Bankers Association. He took advanced training in banking through Bangladesh Barclays Bank in London. In 1963 and 1967, he attended seminars on financing of industry held in Tokyo, Japan as the country's representative. He attended the annual joint meetings of the IFM in 1972, 73 and 74 as the Governor of Bangladesh Bank. He was an alternate member of the Joint Committee of the IFM. He was a member of the Permitting Committee for Establishment of Jute Mills in the Private Sector and the Pakistan Fourth Panchshala Plan Review Committee during his time at IDP.

He was Permanent Representative to UNEP and UNCHS. In 1971 he lost his wife and son in the hands of Pak army. His martyred son and wife are sleeping forever in their house in Samashpur village (Munshiganj district).

In early September of the Liberation War, Hamid Ullah was taken to West Pakistan by the Pakistan Army to testify in the treason case against Bangabandhu Sheikh Mujib and returned to the country after hearing the case.

He is remembered in history for his love for his country, including the loss of his wife and son in the war of liberation.

This fearless patriot famous banker and first governor of Bangladesh Bank A.N. Hamid Ullah passed away in Canada in 1994 and he is resting in eternal sleep in Canada.

References

Bangladeshi economists
Governors of Bangladesh Bank
1919 births
1994 deaths